Puerto Rico Highway 901 (PR-901) is a highway in the southeast coast of Puerto Rico which begins at its junction with PR-182 in Yabucoa and ends at its intersection with PR-760 in Manuabo.

Route description
PR-3 in Yabucoa enters downtown and continues uphill into the mountains. The Puerto Rico Department of Transportation designed PR-901 as a primary route while PR-53 is under construction, because it is a more direct way to the Maunabo area than PR-3, as the latter has more curves. PR-901 runs parallel to the coastline for several kilometers, but due to the mountains ending at the coastline, PR-901 run several hundred feet above sea level. This feature makes PR-901 a scenic route. Drivers traveling from Humacao to the area of Guayama are recommended to use PR-30 to PR-52 and then PR-53 (Salinas-Guayama) as opposed to using the PR-3/PR-901 route because it is safer and shorter. This by-pass will end when construction of PR-53 is completed. When PR-53 is finished, PR-901 will become a normal rural road, and PR-53 will become the primary route to Maunabo.

Major intersections

See also

 List of highways numbered 901

References

External links
 

901